The Battle of Point Pelee was a military engagement in 1763 during Pontiac's Rebellion.

Background 

Pontiac's first nation warriors surrounded Fort Detroit, besieging the British forces inside. On May 28, a supply convoy commanded by Lieutenant Abraham Cuyler stopped at Point Pelee on its way to Detroit. Unaware of the ongoing siege, Cuyler and his men made camp without taking extra security precautions.

Battle 
The following morning, about 200 Natives attacked, killing or capturing 61 of the 96 men of Cuyler's expedition.

Aftermath 
Those who escaped made their way to Fort Sandusky, but found it destroyed, and so they returned to Fort Niagara. The first nations took their captives to Detroit, where they were tortured and mutilated. The bodies were then tossed into the river to float by Fort Detroit, which undermined morale in the fort.

References 

Battles of Pontiac's War
Battles involving Canada